Gladstone is a lightly populated locality in the Carterton District of New Zealand's North Island, located on the Mangahuia Stream near where the Tauweru River joins the Ruamahanga River. The nearest town is Carterton 15 kilometres to the northwest, and nearby settlements include Ponatahi to the west and Longbush to the south. It was named after British prime minister William Ewart Gladstone.

Several other localities in the country are also called Gladstone - an Invercargill suburb, a coastal sawmill village south of Greymouth, a hamlet beside Lake Hāwea and an area near Levin.

History and culture 

Thirty-four deceased soldiers from Gladstone and its surrounds are commemorated by a small roadside war memorial, and part of the main road between Masterton and Gladstone is lined with 36 memorial oaks. Why there are thirty-six rather than thirty-four oaks is unknown.

Marae

The local Hurunui o Rangi Marae is affiliated with the Ngāti Kahungunu hapū of Ngāi Tahu, Ngāi Taneroroa, Ngāti Hinewaka, Ngāti Kaparuparu, Ngāti Moe, Ngāti Parera, Ngāti Rangitataia, Ngāti Rangitehewa, Ngāti Tatuki and Ngāti Te Tomo o Kahungunu, and the Rangitāne hapū of Ngāi Tahu.

In October 2020, the New Zealand Government committed $2,179,654 from the Provincial Growth Fund to upgrade Ngāi Tumapuhia a Rangi ki Okautete, Motuwairaka, Pāpāwai, Kohunui, Hurunui o Rangi and Te Oreore marae. The projects were expected to create 19.8 full time jobs.

Demographics 

Gladstone had a population of 870 at the 2018 New Zealand census, an increase of 54 people (6.6%) since the 2013 census, and an increase of 159 people (22.4%) since the 2006 census. There were 333 households. There were 450 males and 417 females, giving a sex ratio of 1.08 males per female. The median age was 42.6 years (compared with 37.4 years nationally), with 198 people (22.8%) aged under 15 years, 111 (12.8%) aged 15 to 29, 441 (50.7%) aged 30 to 64, and 120 (13.8%) aged 65 or older.

Ethnicities were 93.4% European/Pākehā, 13.4% Māori, 1.0% Pacific peoples, 0.7% Asian, and 2.1% other ethnicities (totals add to more than 100% since people could identify with multiple ethnicities).

The proportion of people born overseas was 12.4%, compared with 27.1% nationally.

Although some people objected to giving their religion, 55.5% had no religion, 34.8% were Christian, 0.3% were Hindu and 2.1% had other religions.

Of those at least 15 years old, 174 (25.9%) people had a bachelor or higher degree, and 78 (11.6%) people had no formal qualifications. The median income was $41,000, compared with $31,800 nationally. The employment status of those at least 15 was that 390 (58.0%) people were employed full-time, 126 (18.8%) were part-time, and 9 (1.3%) were unemployed.

Economy 

Gladstone is primarily a farming community and some viticulture occurs in the area. Viticultural activity is increasing as winemakers realise the potential of soil and climate that produce low yielding rich concentrated grapes. Gladstone also has a number of small businesses and industries, including cafes, homestays, and a wheelwright shop. The Summit Lodge is Gladstone's five star rated guest lodge which has been hosting guests since it was built in 2009.

The Gladstone Inn, known to locals as "The Gladdy", is Gladstone's local pub. It was voted the best country hotel in New Zealand in 2006 survey by the New Zealand Hospitality Association.

Gladstone also has a sports complex, built in 1979 - which is owned and run by the local community.  Admiral Rd is often used by international cycling competitions and it was first "Everested" in 2017

Education 

Gladstone School is the local primary school accommodating approximately 100 children. This has been the main school for the area since the closure of schools in Longbush, Maungaraki, and Te Whiti in 1968.

During the 2010s, the school gained popularity, taking children from Carterton, Martinborough, and Masterton.

Sport 

A sports complex is located in Gladstone near the pub. It is the home of Gladstone's rugby union, hockey and netball clubs.

The Wairarapa Pistol and Shooting Sports Club (formerly the Wairarapa Pistol Club) has a shooting range in the area.

References

External links 

Populated places in the Wellington Region
Wairarapa
Carterton District